The State University of New York North Country Consortium are a group of university colleges in northern New York and Fort Drum since 1985.

State University of New York at Canton
Empire State College
State University of New York Institute of Technology
Jefferson Community College (New York)
State University of New York at Potsdam
State University of New York at Oswego
State University of New York Upstate Medical University

External links
Official website

Public universities and colleges in New York (state)